Get Closer is the seventh studio album by Australian country music artist Keith Urban. It was released on 16 November 2010 via Hit Red and Capitol Nashville. It produced four singles between 2010 and 2011, three of which went to number one on the U.S. Billboard Hot Country Songs chart. This was Urban's first album to not be certified Platinum. Also, it is also his first to not have a single hit reach the Top 40 on the Billboard Hot 100 chart.

Content
The lead single, "Put You in a Song", was co-written by Keith Urban along with fellow artists Sarah Buxton (who co-wrote Urban's 2006 single "Stupid Boy") and Jedd Hughes. From 26 October (Urban's 43rd birthday) to 9 November 2010, one track from the album was released to the US iTunes Store each week (a trend Urban's previous album Defying Gravity followed). Those songs were "Without You", "Long Hot Summer", and "You Gonna Fly" respectively. These three songs (beginning with "Long Hot Summer") were released to the Australian iTunes store on 22 October 29 October, and 5 November 2010. The full album was released on 12 November in Australia.

"Without You", "Long Hot Summer", and "You Gonna Fly" were all released as the album's second, third, and fourth singles in 2011 and they all reached number one on the country charts. Urban co-produced the studio tracks with Dann Huff, and the live bonus tracks with Chris McHugh.

Cover art
Before the album's release, Urban announced a contest in which fans vote for which photo to be the album cover. On 11 October 2010, the official album cover was revealed; it depicts Urban sitting in front of a bed with his guitar beside him.

Reception

Commercial
The album debuted at number seven on the U.S. Billboard 200 and number two on the U.S. Billboard Top Country Albums, selling 162,000 copies its first week of release. As of 4 August 2013, the album has sold 743,000 copies in the US. The album was certified Platinum by the RIAA for one million units in sales, tracks and streams on 17 April 2017.

Critical

Upon its release, Get Closer received generally positive reviews from most music critics. At Metacritic, which assigns a normalized rating out of 100 to reviews from mainstream critics, the album received an average score of 76, based on 7 reviews, which indicates "generally favorable reviews".

Jessica Phillips of Country Weekly gave it a four-star rating, saying "the sugared tunes would be easy to dismiss except for the credible guitar riffs, foot-tapping rhythms and fiery passion with which Keith sings". Andrew Leahey of Allmusic gave it a four star rating, calling it "a lean collection of country-rockers and bedroom ballads". Sarah Rodman of The Boston Globe gave it a favorable review, describing it as something "lean but enjoyable". Blake Boldt of Engine 145 gave the album 3½, responding with "On Get Closer, the affable Aussie celebrates life with a group of eight uplifting songs offering one cohesive message: love is grand".

Matt Bjorke of Roughstock gave it a 3½-star rating, saying "this album is all about happiness with your romantic life. Every song on this short 8 track album discusses matters of the heart with each song discussing various ways that relationships can have on a life". Bill Friskics-Warren of The Washington Post gave it a favorable review, saying "if you're not in the mood for love, the music here – highly burnished country-rock – affords pleasures of its own". Jonathan Keefe with Slant Magazine gave it 3½ stars, calling it "vintage Urban" and saying that "Get Closer his is most carefully edited album, if not necessarily his best". Rolling Stone critic Jon Dolan gave it a 3 star rating, calling it "good-natured country rock".

Track listing

Personnel

Technical
 Justin Niebank – engineer, mixing
 Drew Bollman – engineer, mixing assistant
 David Bryant – assistant engineer
 Joanna Carter – art direction
 Mark Dobson – engineer
 Mike "Frog" Griffith – production coordination
 Mark Hagen – engineer
 Michelle Hall – art producer
 Dann Huff – producer
 Jean-Philippe Piter – photography
 Matt Rausch – assistant engineer
 Jason Spence – assistant engineer
 Keith Urban – producer
 Max Vadukul – photography
 Hank Williams – mastering

Musicians
 Keith Urban – lead vocals, acoustic guitar, electric guitar, banjo, bouzouki, whistle, EBow
 Sarah Buxton – background vocals (on "You Gonna Fly")
 Eric Darken – percussion
 Dan Dugmore – steel guitar
 Stuart Duncan – fiddle
 Karen Fairchild – background vocals (on "You Gonna Fly")
 Dann Huff – acoustic guitar, electric guitar, banjo, EBow, mandocello, mandolin
 David Huff – percussion, programming
 Charlie Judge – keyboards, string arrangements, strings
 Chris McHugh – drums, percussion
 Gordon Mote – piano
 Kimberly Schlapman – background vocals (on "You Gonna Fly")
 Jimmie Lee Sloas – bass guitar
 Russell Terrell – background vocals
 Ilya Toshinsky – acoustic guitar, electric guitar, banjo, resonator guitar, mandolin

Charts and certifications

Weekly charts

Year-end charts

Certifications

Singles

References

2010 albums
Keith Urban albums
Capitol Records albums
Albums produced by Dann Huff